Washington's 3rd congressional district encompasses the southernmost portion of Western Washington. It includes the counties of Lewis, Pacific, Wahkiakum, Cowlitz, Clark, and Skamania; as well as a small portion of southern Thurston county. The district is represented by Democrat Marie Gluesenkamp Perez.

History 
Established after the 1900 census, the 3rd district was represented by Democrats for most of the latter half of the 20th century, until Jolene Unsoeld was defeated by Republican Linda Smith as part of the Republican Revolution of 1994. Smith retired after two terms and was succeeded by Democrat Brian Baird. Baird announced he wouldn't run for re-election in 2010, with Republican Jaime Herrera Beutler winning the seat, during the general election, against Democratic state representative Denny Heck, who was subsequently elected in Washington's 10th congressional district. Herrera Beutler retained her seat over Democrat Jon T. Haugen in 2012. In 2014, she beat Democratic nominee Bob Dingethal.

In presidential elections, the 3rd district is rather competitive. It is the only part of Western Washington to not swing heavily to the Democrats during the 1990s, and it is one of the few districts in the area that cannot be considered safe for either party. It is home to Lewis County, far and away the most conservative county in western Washington. Additionally, most of the district is located in the Portland, Oregon, market; voting patterns there are somewhat different from those in the areas closer to Seattle. George W. Bush narrowly carried the district in 2000 with 48% of the vote and again in 2004 with 50%. The district swung Democratic in 2008, giving Barack Obama 52% of the vote and 46% to John McCain. However, redistricting (see below) extended the district further east and made it slightly more Republican than its predecessor; had the current boundaries been in effect for the 2008 election, Obama would have only defeated McCain by 50.9 percent to 47.1 percent. In 2012, it gave Mitt Romney 49.6% to Obama's 47.9%. In the 2016 presidential election, Republican nominee Donald Trump won the district 49.9% to Hillary Clinton's 42.5%. Trump won every county entirely within the district except Clark County, which he lost by only 316 votes out of over two hundred thousand, including carrying three counties (Pacific, Wahkiakum and Cowlitz) that voted for Walter Mondale in 1984. In 2020, Trump won the district 50.6% to Joe Biden's 46.9%, however, the incumbent Republican Congresswoman, Jaime Herrera Beutler, over-performed the incumbent President, winning the district by a margin of 13%.  

Following the 2020 Census, the 3rd district was slightly changed during redistricting, losing Klickitat county to the 4th district and gaining an additional small sliver of Thurston county from the 10th district. The new 3rd district was marginally more favorable for Republicans, voting for Trump in 2020 by a margin of 4.2%, as opposed to the old district's 3.7%. Despite this, Democratic challenger Marie Gluesenkamp Pérez bested Republican nominee Joe Kent by 2,629 votes in 2022. It was one of five districts that voted for Trump in the 2020 presidential election while being won or held by a Democrat in 2022.

Recent results from presidential races

List of members representing the district

Recent election results

2010

2012

2014

2016

2018

2020

2022

Census 2010 redistricting 
The Washington State Redistricting Commission is charged with adjusting congressional and legislative district boundaries after each decennial census. Given Washington State's growth over the prior decade, Washington gained an additional congressional district for the 113th congress. The third district needed to lose 106,894 people in the redistricting process in order to meet the new ideal population of 672,454. On September 13, 2011, the four voting commissioners on the Redistricting Commission submitted draft proposals for the congressional map. All four draft proposals left the entirety of Lewis, Wahkiakum, Cowlitz, and Clark Counties, and all or most of Skamania county in the 3rd district. In addition, each proposal added population from one or more of Pacific, Thurston, Pierce, or Klickitat counties.

The final approved map for the 3rd district included the entirety of Klickitat, Skamania, Clark, Cowlitz, Wahkiakum, Pacific, and Lewis counties, with the extreme southern part of Thurston County south of highway 12, Washington State Route 507, and the Vail Cut Off Road.

See also 
2008 United States House of Representatives elections in Washington
2010 United States House of Representatives elections in Washington
2012 United States House of Representatives elections in Washington
2014 United States House of Representatives elections in Washington
2016 United States House of Representatives elections in Washington
2018 United States House of Representatives elections in Washington
2020 United States House of Representatives elections in Washington

References
Specific

General
 
 
 Congressional Biographical Directory of the United States 1774–present Their final version was approved and sent to the legislature on January 1, 2012.

External links
Washington State Redistricting Commission
Find your new congressional district: a searchable map, Seattle Times, January 13, 2012

03